Nidka is a small river of Poland. It connects the lakes Bełdany and Nidzkie.

Rivers of Poland
Rivers of Warmian-Masurian Voivodeship